Bradley Klahn and Michael Venus were the defending champions, but Venus chose to compete in the ATP World Tour. Bradley Klahn played alongside Jordan Thompson and they lost in the semifinals.

Daniel Cox and Daniel Smethurst won the title, defeating Marius Copil and Sergiy Stakhovsky in the final, 6–7(3–7), 6–2, [10–6].

Seeds

Draw

Draw

References
 Main Draw

Levene Gouldin and Thompson Tennis Challenger - Doubles
2014 Doubles
2014 Levene Gouldin & Thompson Tennis Challenger